The Copa Héctor Rivadavia Gómez was a football friendly competition contested between Argentina and Uruguay national teams. There were five editions of this competitions, held between 1935 and 1943, with all of them won by Argentina.

The trophy was named after Héctor Rivadavia Gómez, Uruguayan journalist and politician, president of the Uruguayan Football Federation and mentor to the creation of the South American Football Confederation (officialised by the Argentina, Brasil, Chile and Uruguay associations in 1916).

The cup has its counterpart, the Copa Juan Mignaburu, held in Argentina in parallel with this competition.

List of champions 
The following list includes all the editions of the Cup:

Notes

Titles by country

All-time topscorers

See also
 Argentina–Uruguay football rivalry

References

Argentina–Uruguay football rivalry
r
r
r
r
r